"Crucified Boy" was the name of a false anti-Ukrainian atrocity propaganda story disseminated in Russia in July 2014, during the war in Donbas.

The story was first published by Eurasianist philosopher Aleksandr Dugin on 9 July 2014. It was then republished in news reports, officially titled "A refugee from Sloviansk recalls how a young son and a wife of a militiaman were executed in front of her". It was shown on the Russian state-owned Channel One Russia on 12 July 2014. It contained allegations of a public crucifixion of a three-year-old boy performed by Ukrainian soldiers at "Lenin Square" in Sloviansk, as told by an alleged resident of Sloviansk, Halyna Pyshnyak, a native of Zakarpattya. The story has become a staple example of Russian fake news.

The spread of the fake story served to distract from the Donetsk People's Republic's withdrawal from Sloviansk, and the cross-border shelling of Ukraine by Russian armed forces.

History 
Investigative journalists from the Russian news outlets Novaya Gazeta and Dozhd who visited Sloviansk did not find any supporting evidence to back up the allegations, nor did they find any audio or video footage of the incident which was unusual as actions of the Ukrainian army in the city were well documented at the time. BBC News pointed out that there is no "Lenin Square" in Sloviansk, although there is an "October Revolution Square". An investigation of Pyshnyak determined that her husband was a former Berkut unit member who had joined the separatist unit led by Igor Strelkov.

The incident was later widely used as an example of disinformation or fake news that "became the standard" for modern Russian mass media. In Russian mass culture, the episodethis "good piece of propaganda"became "synonymous for journalist fakes." The spread of the news about the "crucified boy" was later used for statistical analysis of the expansion of fake information in modern social networks and search engines.

Galina Timchenko, the former editor of Russian news portal "Lenta.ru", said that it was a gross breach of professional ethics by the leading Russian television channels. Russian opposition leader Alexei Navalny called Channel One Russia "nuts" for airing the report. Another Russian opposition politician, Boris Nemtsov, stated that it was an attempt to rally naive people behind the idea of a war against Ukraine. Russia Today, which was widely reporting the story on their TV channel and online with headline "Kiev army now literally crucify babies in towns, forces mothers to watch", later deleted the story from their website and denied any previous involvement; however, most copies of their coverage on social media remained in place.

The story was officially retracted by Channel One, which was the first to air it, on 21 December 2014, saying they had merely relayed a purported eyewitness report.

A similar story was distributed in April 2021 when Russian media widely reported that a Ukrainian UAV killed a boy in Oleksandrivsk village. Investigative journalists determined that the child had actually died as a result of the explosion of a land mine stored unsafely in a village resident's garage. The UAV narrative was invented by the press service of the Donetsk People's Republic.

See also 
 Blood libel
 The Crucified Soldier
 Media portrayal of the Ukrainian crisis
 Propaganda in Russia

References

Further reading

Books 
 Skillen D. The normalisation of lying - Living with the lies // Freedom of Speech in Russia: Politics and Media from Gorbachev to Putin.—Routledge, 2016.—372 p.—(BASEES/Routledge Series on Russian and East European Studies).—.
 Van Herpen M. H. The "Hybrid War" in Ukraine: From Misinformation to Disinformation // Putin's Propaganda Machine: Soft Power and Russian Foreign Policy.—Rowman & Littlefield, 2015.—336 p.—.
 Snyder T. Learn from peers in other countries // On Tyranny: Twenty Lessons from the Twentieth Century.—Random House, 2017.—128 p.—.
 Nalbandov R. Fear and Loathing in Russian Political Culture // Not by Bread Alone: Russian Foreign Policy Under Putin.—University of Nebraska Press, 2016.—648 p.—.
 Monshipouri M. Social media Kyivs Euromaidan and demands // Information Politics, Protests, and Human Rights in the Digital Age.—Cambridge University Press, 2016.—326 p.—.
 Conradi P. "You do it too" // Who Lost Russia?: How the World Entered a New Cold War.—Oneworld Publications, 2017.—400 p.—.
 Ostrovsky A. Epilogue: Aerial Combat // The Invention of Russia: The Journey from Gorbachev's Freedom to Putin's War.—Atlantic Books Ltd, 2015.—400 p.—.
 David Satter. A System Under Threat // The Less You Know, The Better You Sleep: Russia's Road to Terror and Dictatorship under Yeltsin and Putin.—Yale University Press, 2016.—224 p.—.

Articles 
 Kinstler L. How to Survive a Russian Hack // The Atlantic.—2017.—2 February.
 Higgins A. Fake News, Fake Ukrainians: How a Group of Russians Tilted a Dutch Vote // The New York Times.—2017.—16 February.
 Danilova M. Truth and the Russian media: Unhinged claims about the Malaysia jet are part of a broader propaganda campaign // Columbia Journalism Review (CJR).—2014.—22 July.
 Eduard Palchys: I Can Switch Over To Belarusian Language Without Any Problems // Charter97.—2017.—6 February.—ISSN 2543-4969.
 Maheshwari V. Ukraine's fight against fake news goes global: Countering Kremlin disinformation is one area where Kiev has the upper hand // Politico.—2017.—12 March.
 VanderMey A. W. Ukraine's fight against fake news goes global: Countering Kremlin disinformation is one area where Kiev has the upper hand // The Wilson Quarterly.—2016.—Fall.
 Putz C. Uzbek Nanny Beheads Child in Moscow // The Diplomat.—2016.—3 March.
 Frye B. Conflict & Diplomacy: Detoxing Russia // Transitions Online (TOL).—2015.—3 March.—P. 1–3.
 Nygren G., Glowacki M., Hök J., Kiria I., Orlova D. Journalism in the Crossfire: Media coverage of the war in Ukraine in 2014 // Journalism Studies.—2016.—22 November.—P. 1–20.—ISSN 1461-670X.—DOI:10.1080/1461670X.2016.1251332.

External links 
 Video footage. YouTube. 15 July 2014 (in Russian)
 Anna Nemtsova. There's No Evidence the Ukrainian Army Crucified a Child in Slovyansk. The Daily Beast. 15 July 2014

2014 hoaxes
Fake news
Propaganda in Russia
Propaganda legends
War in Donbas